Cotsworth or Cotesworth may refer to:

Cotesworth, historic mansion in North Carrollton, Mississippi
Cotesworth P. Smith (1807–1862), Associate Justice and Chief Justice of the Supreme Court of Mississippi
Cotsworth L25S, a James Cycle Co. motorcycle manufactured from 1959 to 1962
Moses B. Cotsworth (1859–1943), British accountant, business analyst, and calendar reformer
 Cotsworth calendar, an International Fixed Calendar model developed by Moses B. Cotsworth
Staats Cotsworth (1908–1979), American old-time radio actor
William Cotesworth (1665–1730), Member of Parliament for Great Grimsby

See also
Chatsworth (disambiguation)
Coatsworth